Leandro Soto (born  Leandro Soto Ortiz; March 1, 1956 – July 3, 2022) was a Cuban-American multidisciplinary visual/installation and performance artist. He was also a set and costume designer for theater and film.  Soto studied at Escuela Nacional de Arte National Art Schools (Cuba) and Instituto Superior de Arte, University of Havana.  As an educator he taught and lectured at various Higher Education institutions in the U.S. and abroad.  Soto also founded a creative workshop, El Tesoro de Tamulte, in Tabasco, Mexico, from which professional artists emerged.

Biography
Soto was born on March 1, 1956, in Cienfuegos, Cuba, where is also where he spent his early life.

Soto was one of the leading figures of the influential “Volumen Uno”, an artistic movement that changed the course of Cuban Art in the decade of the 1980s, in which he was the first artist in his generation to work with the Afro-Cuban heritage.  He was also credited with being the first performance and installation artist on the island.

In his performances and the visual/installation art which emerged from his performances, Soto responded to the postmodern coordinates of implosion and satire, often subverting the inceptions of culturally accepted notions of high/kitsch, traditional/pop, global/local, and profane/sacred art forms. Throughout his artistic career, he demonstrated an interest in religion, ritual, and the mythology of indigenous people.

Soto died July 3, 2022, in California.

Selected solo exhibitions 

2018             Crónicas visuales.  Museo Nacional de Bellas Artes.  Havana, Cuba (current catalog, ISBN no. pending)
2015            hacia todas partes ir II. (Everywhere I go) La Acacia Art Gallery, Havana, Cuba.
2013            Carpentier in Barbados. Errol Barrow Center for Creative Imagination Art Gallery. University of The West Indies. Barbados, West Indies.
2012            Leandro Soto: Open Windows to the Caribbean. Museum of Finest Cuban Art.  Vienna, Austria.
2011  Cuba in the Southwest: The Art of Leandro Soto.  Sangre de Cristo Art Center: Hoag Gallery.  Pueblo, Colorado.
2006            Leandro Soto Recent Works. Paulina Miller Art Gallery. Phoenix, Arizona
1997     	A Glance over the Garden.  Big Orbit Gallery.  Buffalo, New York
1992	        Resonancias de la selva (Resonances of the jungle). Galería Nina Menocal, México D.F.
1984             Retablo familiar (Family altarpiece).  Casa de la Cultura. Plaza Gallery and Art Center.  Havana, Cuba.

Selected group exhibitions 
2019             Sacbé, Camino de Intercambio (White Road, Exchange Path).  Casa del Benemérito de las Américas Benito Juárez, Old Havana, Cuba.
2017             Adiós Utopía: Art in Cuba Since 1950. The Museum of Fine Arts. Houston, Texas
2014            Drapetomania, The 8th Floor, New York, NY 
2011 Ajiaco: Stirrings of the Cuban Soul.  Newark Museum, Newark, New Jersey.
2008             Cuba! Art and History from 1868 through Today. Musee des Beaux Arts de Montreal, Quebec
2004  Confluencias: Leandro Soto and Raoul Deal. Walker's Point Center for the Arts, Milwaukee, Wisconsin 
1998  Ceremonial Lands.  Buffalo Arts Studios.  Buffalo, New York. 
1997             Breaking Barriers. Museum of Fine Arts of Ft. Lauderdale. Florida.
1987            Prague Quadrennial of Stage Design, Prague, Czech Republic
1989             Kitsch.  Third Havana Biennial. Galiano-Concordia Art Center.  Havana, Cuba.
1981             Volumen Uno. International Art Center.  Havana, Cuba

Selected collections 

Soto's work is held in a number of institutional collections, including:
The CIFO Collection, Miami. FL.
MOCA. Museum of Contemporary Art, North Miami. FL.
Museo Nacional de Bellas Artes, Havana, Cuba
Jerome Lawrence and Robert E. Lee Theater Research Institute. Ohio State University.  Columbus, Ohio 
Museum of Finest Cuban Art, Vienna, Austria
Dr. Arturo and Lisa Mosquera, Private Collection of Contemporary Art, Miami, FL
Mount Holyoke College Art Museum.  South Hadley Mass.

Selected publications

Further reading 

"De Palo pa' Rumba:" An Interview with Leandro Soto, by Isabel Alvarez-Borland (2007). Afro-Hispanic Review, republished by Cross Works, College of the Holy Cross

Notes and references

External links

 The Leandro Soto papers consist primarily of original drawings of set and costume designs, audiovisual materials, posters, and photographs of productions and exhibitions documenting the work of visual and performance artist Leandro Soto. While the collection also includes correspondence, clippings, press releases, manuscripts, and theater and exhibitions programs, the bulk of materials relate to Soto's artistic production in the United States since 1992.  Leandro Soto papers are available through the University of Miami Libraries Digital Collections portal.
 Creator page for Leandro Soto Ortiz in the Cuban Theater Digital Archive.
 Artist File : Miscellaneous Uncataloged Material
 leandrosoto.com

1956 births
2022 deaths
Cuban contemporary artists
Cuban emigrants to the United States
Exiles of the Cuban Revolution in Mexico
Costume designers
Exiles of the Cuban Revolution in the United States
People from Cienfuegos